Gastrocymba quadriradiata is a clingfish of the family  Gobiesocidae, found only around New Zealand's subantarctic islands. This species was described in 1955 by the Swedish zoologist Hialmar Rendahl from a holotype collected at Port Ross on Auckland Island.

References

Gobiesocidae
Endemic marine fish of New Zealand
Monotypic fish genera
Fish described in 1926